The Joon-Aryk is a river in Kochkor District of Naryn Region of Kyrgyzstan. It is formed by confluence of Kara-Kujur and Telek rivers. Average annual discharge - 11.4 cubic meters per second. The Chu is formed by the confluence of Kochkor and Joon Aryk near the village Kochkor.

References

Rivers of Kyrgyzstan
Tian Shan